Catholic Sangji College is a private 2-year college affiliated with the South Korean Roman Catholic church.  It is located in the city center of Andong City, North Gyeongsang province, South Korea.  The president is Yu Gang-ha (유강하).  As a technical junior college, Catholic Sangji College emphasizes team teaching and project-based learning.

Academic departments
Division of Humanities:
 Early childhood education
 Social welfare
 Management
 Tax accounting
 Hotel tourism
 Police management
 Administration

Division of Health and Nursing
 Speech-language pathology
 Medical computing
 Traditional medicines
 Nursing

Division of Natural Science
 Hotel cuisine and nutrition

Division of Industry
 Computer information
 Information communications
 Railroad electricity
 Automotive technology
 Computer multimedia design
 Interior design

History
The college began in 1970 as Sangji Technical School. It was founded by three Luxembourgian nuns of the order, Soeurs de la Doctrine Chrétienne (French, “Sisters of the Christian Doctrine”).

Sister schools
Sangji Catholic College maintains ties with four American institutions:  University of California Riverside, Georgia Southwestern University, and North Park University.  In addition, sisterhood relations exist between the automotive departments of Sangji Catholic and Kennedy King Community College in Chicago.

See also
 List of colleges and universities in South Korea
 Education in South Korea

External links
 Official school website, in English

Universities and colleges in North Gyeongsang Province
1970 establishments in South Korea
Educational institutions established in 1970
Catholic universities and colleges in South Korea